This is a list of members of the Belgian Chamber of Representatives during the 55th legislature (2019–2024). These Members of Parliament were elected in the 2019 Belgian federal election.

List

New Flemish Alliance 

 Björn Anseeuw
Theo Francken
 Darya Safai
 Peter De Roover
 Sophie De Wit
 Yngvild Ingels
Michael Freilich
Zuhal Demir
Kathleen Depoorter
Peter Buysrogge
Frieda Gijbels
Sander Loones
Anneleen Van Bossuyt
Kristien Van Vaerenbergh
Bert Wollants

Ecolo 

 Kristof Calvo
 Wouter De Vriendt

Socialist Party 

 Ahmed Laaouej
 Özlem Zengin
 Eliane Tillieux

Vlaams Belang 

 Barbara Pas
 Tom Van Grieken
 Dries Van Langenhove

Reformist Movement 

 Daniel Bacquelaine
 Marie-Christine Marghem
 Florence Reuter

Workers' Party 

 Nabil Boukili
 Gaby Colebunders
 Greet Daems  		
 Roberto D'Amico  		
 Steven De Vuyst		
 Raoul Hedebouw
 Sofie Merckx	
 Peter Mertens  		
 Nadia Moscufo		
 Marco Van Hees	
 Maria Vindevoghel  		
 Thierry Warmoes

Christen-Democratisch en Vlaams 

 Nahima Lanjri

Open Flemish Liberals and Democrats 

 Maggie De Block
 Robby De Caluwé
 Patrick Dewael
 Christian Leysen
 Goedele Liekens

Vooruit 

 Melissa Depraetere	
 Karin Jiroflée  		
 Bert Moyaers  		
 Vicky Reynaert	
 Ben Segers	
 Joris Vandenbroucke	
 Gitta Vanpeborgh  		
 Anja Vanrobaeys 		
 Kris Verduyckt

Humanist Democratic Centre 

 Josy Arens	
 Georges Dallemagne
 Catherine Fonck	
 Vanessa Matz
 Maxime Prévot

DéFI 

 François De Smet
 Sophie Rohonyi

References 

Lists of members of the Chamber of Representatives (Belgium)
2010s in Belgium
2020s in Belgium
21st-century Belgian politicians
2019 establishments in Belgium
Belgium